Saint-Cloud is a station in the commune of Saint-Cloud (department of Hauts-de-Seine). It is in the Île-de-France region of France and is part of the Transilien rail network.

The station 
The station is on line L and U trains of the Transilien Paris–Saint Lazare network.  It is at the junction of the Saint-Nom-la-Bretèche and Versailles–Rive Droite branches.  Up until 1930, there was a branch about 160 m long providing service to the Château de Saint-Cloud.

References

External links
 

Railway stations in Hauts-de-Seine
Railway stations in France opened in 1839